Moderne landhaaien is a 1926 Dutch silent comedy film directed by Alex Benno.

Cast
 Kees Pruis - Hugo Writley
 Jan Grootveld - Longway
 Jan Rentmeester - Hugo's vader
 Maurits de Vries - Landhaai
 André van Dijk - Landhaai
 Vera van Haeften - Hulpen van de landhaaien
 Dolly Grey - Hulpen van de landhaaien
 Willy Thomas - Neger
 Willem Faassen - Paul Mathon
 Jan van Dommelen - Bezoeker in cabaret
 Sylvain Poons
 Mary Beekman
 Betsy van Berkel
 Nelly Ernst
 Ko Rentmeester

External links 
 

1926 films
Dutch silent feature films
Dutch black-and-white films
1926 comedy films
Films directed by Alex Benno
Dutch comedy films
Silent comedy films